"Wild for the Night" is a song by American hip hop recording artist ASAP Rocky and primarily produced by Skrillex. It was released on March 26, 2013, as the third single from his debut studio album Long. Live. ASAP. On March 26, 2013 the song was officially released to rhythmic crossover radio as the third single and the music video was released. The song peaked at number 80 on the Billboard Hot 100.

"Wild for the Night" is primarily based on Skrillex's "Goin' Down" mix of the Birdy Nam Nam song "Goin' In".

Background
"Wild for the Night" was released as the album's second promotional single on January 11, 2013. The single listed both Skrillex and Birdy Nam Nam as featured guests, although the only guest listed on the album is Skrillex who produced the track along with Birdy Nam Nam and later remixed it with Rocky as Lord Flacko. It was confirmed shortly after by Rocky himself that the track will serve as the third official single.

Music video
The music video was shot in the Dominican Republic with Skrillex and featured cameos from the ASAP Mob.  The music video premiered on March 25, 2013 on 106 & Park. The video was directed by A$AP and Chris Robinson, and is 5 minutes and 52 seconds duration, from start to finish.

Live performances
Rocky performed a live version of the song for BBC Radio 1's Live Lounge, which features on the Live Lounge 2013 compilation album.

Critical reception
NME ranked the song at number 20, on their list of the 50 best songs of 2013. They commented saying, "the pitch-shifted vocals of A$AP Rocky and the intergalactic bass overload of Skrillex were at odds with one another, yet the rapper and producer combined to make 2013's biggest mongrel banger. ‘Wild For The Night’ was brash and obnoxious, but by defying convention this odd couple gave both the hip-hop and EDM kids their anthem for the year."

Awards and nominations

Chart performance

Year-end charts

Certifications

Release history

References

2013 singles
ASAP Rocky songs
Skrillex songs
2013 songs
RCA Records singles
Songs written by ASAP Rocky
Song recordings produced by Skrillex
Songs written by Skrillex
Songs about drugs
Music videos directed by Chris Robinson (director)